The Order of the Temple of the Rosy Cross (OTRC) was an early 20th century theosophical group. It was founded in 1912 by leaders of the Theosophical Society, including Annie Besant, Marie Russak and James Ingall Wedgwood.

According to Gregory Tillett, in Charles Webster Leadbeater 1854-1934, both Russak and Wedgwood were mediums who purportedly communicated messages from the Masters during Temple meetings. Russak's understudy in the Temple was Lady Emily Lutyens, the English representative of the Order of the Star in the East and editor of its journal, Herald of the Star, who was also in the society's esoteric section and "introduced wealthy converts" who financed the society.

And it added that: "To confide in that such work serves as preliminary for the restoration of the missing Mysteries of Europe with the decadence of Rome".

Sophia announced that "The Council of the Order is composed by 12 Brothers deeply interested in all that refers to the Ceremonial Occultism and Archaic Mysteries, and that they hope to form a useful instrument, under the inspiration of the Master Rákóczi, to resuscitate the Old Mysteries and to prepare the arrival of the Master of the World".
Temple members wore white tunics and met biweekly in "Oratory" and "Laboratory".  
In the oratory, they expounded and discussed spiritual and philosophical texts. In the laboratory introspective work and ritual was practised.

Charles Webster Leadbeater disapproved of the Temple because he neither established nor controlled it, and mediums, other than Besant and Leadbeater, communicated messages from the Masters. He claimed that the rituals "produced 'adverse forces so Leadbeater unsuccessfully "tried to persuade" Lutyens "to have it reorganized along lines which he suggested." In 1914, Leadbeater communicated "a message from the Master ordering its dissolution."

The Order was resuscitated in 2016 by an elder brother based in England and subsequently also in Fresonara, Italy.

See also
Order of the Temple of the Rosy Cross
Rosicrucianism
Theosophy

Notes

References

Rosicrucian organizations
Theosophy